Austra is a Latvian and Lithuanian feminine given name. The associated name day is March 5.

Notable people named Austra
 Austra Skujiņa (1909–1932), Latvian poet
 Austra Skujytė (born 1979), Lithuanian athlete

References

Latvian feminine given names
Lithuanian feminine given names